Edwin Herbert Montague (13 April 1885 – 28 December 1937) was a British athlete. He competed at the 1908 Summer Olympics in London.

Montague won his preliminary heat in the 400 metres with a time of 50.2 seconds. He dropped his time to 49.8 seconds in the semifinals, but lost to Wyndam Halswelle who set a new Olympic record at 48.4 seconds in the race. Montague's second-place finish in the semifinals resulted in his not advancing to the final.

He was also a member of the British team which was eliminated in the first round of the medley relay event by the United States.

References

Sources
 
 
 

1885 births
1937 deaths
British male sprinters
Athletes (track and field) at the 1908 Summer Olympics
Olympic athletes of Great Britain